Asaccus platyrhynchus, the flat-snouted leaf-toed gecko, is a species of lizard in the family Phyllodactylidae. It is endemic to northern Oman, in desert and rocky areas. Asaccus platyrhynchus was first formally described in 1994.

References

Asaccus
Reptiles of the Arabian Peninsula
Endemic fauna of Oman
Reptiles described in 1994
Taxa named by Edwin Nicholas Arnold